The 1885 season was the second season of regional competitive association football in Australia. The South British Football Soccer Association introduced their NSW football league (now known as the National Premier Leagues NSW) as the first league competition in Australia.

League competitions

Cup competitions

Representative matches
New South Wales and Victoria played a match on 16 July 1885 at East Melbourne Cricket Ground. Victoria won the match 4–0 with two goals by H. Dunbar and one goal each from F. Ware and U.F. Robbins.

See also
 Soccer in Australia

References

1885 in Australian soccer
Seasons in Australian soccer
1885 in Australian sport
N
Australian soccer